Denmark generally uses an eight-digit closed telephone numbering plan. Subscriber numbers are portable with respect to provider and geography, i.e. fixed line numbers can be ported to any physical address in Denmark.

The Kingdom of Denmark also includes two autonomous regions, the Faroe Islands and Greenland, although each has been assigned its own country calling code and has a separate numbering plan. Previously, the Faroe Islands also used the country code +45.

Numbering

Split charge is not generally used in Denmark anymore; calls to 70 numbers are usually charged as regular landline calls. A few exceptions do exist, e.g., 70 10 11 55 (the TDC speaking clock service).

In the latest published numbering plan, from 2016, there are exceptions to the landline series above. Almost all landline series have one or more exception based on their 3rd digit. Eg. 43-xx-xx-xx is designated as landline numbers, however 43-1x-xx-xx has been reassigned as a cellphone range.

Special numbers
 Emergency (Police, Fire, Ambulance): 112
 Police (non-emergency, nearest physical Police Station): 114
 Other 3 digit short codes are reserved.
 Carrier select codes: 10xx
 Service numbers (such as directory enquiries): 18xx
 Carrier select codes for data: 16xxx
 Social services: 116xxx

Former area codes in Denmark 

The Faroe Islands later adopted their own country code +298, with international dialling from Denmark being required.

8-digit numbering took place in the years 1986/87, so that the area code had to be used every time, also for local calls.

On 2. September 1986 in the 01, 02, 03 areas (Zealand, Lolland-Falster, Bornholm and Møn).

On 15.  May  1987 in the 09 area (Funen and surrounding islands).

On 16 May 1989, digit 0 was omitted as the first digit, and all telephone numbers should start with a number from 3 to 9.

Today (since 1989) the same telephone number is dialed in Denmark, regardless of where you call from, but the dialling information is still in principle at the forefront of the number. Numbers beginning with 20-31 are preferably mobile numbers, those beginning with 70 and 72-79 are preferably landline numbers, and so on.

References

Denmark
Telephone numbers